Mihret Topčagić (born 21 June 1988) is a Bosnian professional footballer who currently plays as a striker in Croatian Prva liga for Osijek.
He began playing football in 1994, in Austria.

Club career
On 19 January 2016, Topčagić returned to Austria, signing for Rheindorf Altach on an 18-month contract.

A big forward, he joined FK Sūduva in summer 2018. In January 2021, he moved to Croatian top-tier side NK Osijek.

Career statistics

Club

References

External links
 Austrian career stats - ÖFB
 Profile - NK Osijek

1988 births
Living people
People from Gračanica, Bosnia and Herzegovina
Austrian people of Bosnia and Herzegovina descent
Association football forwards
Bosnia and Herzegovina footballers
Austrian footballers
FC Kärnten players
FC Admira Wacker Mödling players
Wolfsberger AC players
FC Shakhter Karagandy players
SC Rheindorf Altach players
FK Sūduva Marijampolė players
Austrian Football Bundesliga players
2. Liga (Austria) players
Austrian Regionalliga players
Kazakhstan Premier League players
A Lyga players
Bosnia and Herzegovina expatriate footballers
Expatriate footballers in Austria
Bosnia and Herzegovina expatriate sportspeople in Austria
Expatriate footballers in Kazakhstan
Bosnia and Herzegovina expatriate sportspeople in Kazakhstan
Expatriate footballers in Lithuania
Bosnia and Herzegovina expatriate sportspeople in Lithuania
NK Osijek players